Dulahazara Union is a union, the smallest administrative body of Bangladesh, located in Chakaria Upazila, Cox's Bazar District, Bangladesh The total population was 42,904 in 2011.

References

Unions of Chakaria Upazila